Messier 2 or M2 (also designated NGC 7089) is a globular cluster in the constellation Aquarius, five degrees north of the star Beta Aquarii. It was discovered by Jean-Dominique Maraldi in 1746, and is one of the largest known globular clusters.

Discovery and visibility
M2 was discovered by the French astronomer Jean-Dominique Maraldi in 1746 while observing a comet with Jacques Cassini. Charles Messier rediscovered it in 1760, but thought it a nebula without any stars associated with it. William Herschel, in 1783, was the first to resolve individual stars in the cluster.

M2 is, under extremely good conditions, just visible to the naked eye. Binoculars or a small telescope will identify this cluster as non-stellar, while larger telescopes will resolve individual stars, of which the brightest are of apparent magnitude 13.1.

Characteristics

M2 is about 55,000 light-years distant from Earth. At 175 light-years in diameter, it is one of the larger globular clusters known. The cluster is rich, compact, and significantly elliptical. It is 13 billion years old and one of the older globulars associated with the Milky Way galaxy.

M2 contains about 150,000 stars, including 21 known variable stars.  Its brightest stars are red and yellow giant stars.  The overall spectral type is F4.
M2 is part of the Gaia Sausage, the hypothesized remains of a merged dwarf galaxy.

Data from Gaia has led to the discovery of an extended tidal stellar stream, about 45 degrees long and 300 light-years (100 pc) wide, that is likely associated with M2. It was possibly perturbed due to the presence of the Large Magellanic Cloud.

Oosterhoff Classification
M2 is defined as an Oosterhoff type II globular cluster. Oosterhoff type is a classification system of globular clusters originally observed by Pieter Oosterhoff in where globular clusters are generally separated into two types. Oosterhoff type is determined by metallicity, age, and average pulsation period of type ab RR Lyrae variable stars of the cluster. A cluster metallicity below -1.6, an age above 13 billion years, and an average RRab Lyrae pulsation period around .64 days indicates a type II cluster.

M2 is a bit of an anomaly in reference to Oosterhoff type. While it satisfies the metallicity and RRab Lyrae pulsation period conditions, it actually has an age of 12.5 Gyr, well below the cutoff age of 13 Gyr normal for a Oosterhoff type II cluster. This is unexpected because age of a cluster is generally determined from metallicity. However, this abnormality is explained in a article by Marín-Franch.

References

See also 
 List of Messier objects

External links 

 M2,SEDS Messier pages
 M2, Galactic Globular Clusters Database page
 Historic observations of M2
 M2 in the Staracle Messier catalog
 

Globular clusters
NGC objects
002
 Gaia-Enceladus
Aquarius (constellation)
17460911